Skin to Skin is a pop song recorded by Australian recording artist Melissa. The song was released on 5 April 1992 as the third single from Melissa's debut studio album, Fresh. It peaked at number 16 on the Australian Singles Chart, becoming her final top-20 hit in Australia.

Music video
The music video for this song features Melissa in a various number of outfits, such as a long black dress and purple shirt, and also features Melissa lying on a satin-sheeted bed. Comparisons between the "Skin to Skin" film clip to that of Kylie Minogue's "What Do I Have to Do" are numerous. This clip also sees Melissa backed by dancers clad head to toe in black and white lycra.

Track listing
Australian CD and cassette single
 "Skin to Skin" – 3:49
 "Take It from Me" – 4:04

Charts

References

1992 singles
1992 songs
Australian dance-pop songs
Melissa Tkautz songs
Phonogram Records singles
Songs written by Leon Berger